The Eau Claire Public Library building is located in Eau Claire, Wisconsin.

History
The structure housed a public library until the late 1970s, at which time it was converted into a municipal office building. It was a Carnegie library. The building was listed on the National Register of Historic Places in 1983 and on the State Register of Historic Places in 1989.

References

Libraries on the National Register of Historic Places in Wisconsin
Office buildings on the National Register of Historic Places in Wisconsin
Government buildings on the National Register of Historic Places in Wisconsin
National Register of Historic Places in Eau Claire County, Wisconsin
Carnegie libraries in Wisconsin
Buildings and structures in Eau Claire, Wisconsin
Beaux-Arts architecture in Wisconsin
Limestone buildings in the United States
Library buildings completed in 1903